Charles H. Sykes (January 11, 1881 – December 5, 1966) was a member of the Wisconsin State Assembly.

Life
Sykes was born on January 11, 1881, in Brodhead, Wisconsin. After graduating from Milton Junction High School, he attended Janesville Business College. Sykes died in a hospital in Youngtown, Arizona.

Political career
Sykes was a member of the Assembly from 1939 to 1958. He was first elected as a member of the Progressive Party but became a Republican in 1943.

References

1881 births
1966 deaths
People from Brodhead, Wisconsin
Members of the Wisconsin State Assembly
20th-century American politicians